Yvo Molenaers (born 25 February 1934) is a Belgian racing cyclist. He won the 1963 Tour de Luxembourg.

External links 

1934 births
Living people
Belgian male cyclists
Cyclists from Limburg (Belgium)
People from Riemst
Tour de Suisse stage winners
20th-century Belgian people